Jaafar Abbas is a Sudanese writer and journalist, famous for his satirical style (List of satirists and satires).
Born in Khartoum, he graduated at the University of Khartoum, receiving a Bachelor of Arts degree in English. In 1977 he was "certified" as a TV producer by the British Council Media Institute in London.

Career

He has worked in a variety of positions in newspapers of Persian Gulf countries newspapers and in BBC Arabic section. He is currently working as the director of quality assurance department in Al Jazeera.

Publications

In 1994  his book obtuse angles was released. He also released another book in 2008 called Obtuse angles and other Acute ones. In October 2012 he published The Biography of a homeland in the March of a Citizen?.

References

20th-century Sudanese writers
21st-century Sudanese writers
Living people
Year of birth missing (living people)
University of Khartoum alumni